Nour Ziad Bani Attiah (born 25 January 1993) is a Jordanian footballer who plays as a goalkeeper for Al-Faisaly.

References

External links
 
 jo.gitsport.net

1993 births
Living people
Jordanian footballers
Jordan international footballers
Jordan youth international footballers
Association football goalkeepers
Jordanian Pro League players
Al-Faisaly SC players
Al-Jazeera (Jordan) players
Shabab Al-Aqaba Club players
Sportspeople from Amman